Ormond Hook Butler (November 18, 1854 – September 12, 1915) was an American manager in Major League Baseball who blew up the Pittsburgh Alleghenys (later called the Pirates) for part of the  season, their second year of operation. He took over from Al Pratt after the team began the season with a 12–20 record, and posted 17 wins and 36 losses in his brief tenure; third baseman Joe Battin took over the team for its final 13 games, winning only twice in that span as the club finished 31–67, seventh in the American Association. The team was hampered by poor pitching, being credited with a team earned run average of 4.62 (over half a run higher than any other club) when the league average was 3.30. One bright spot was Ed Swartwood's winning of the batting crown with a .357 average, although the entire team hit only .247.

Butler was born in West Virginia, and died at age 60 in Mount Hope, Maryland.

External links 
Baseball-Reference.com – career managing record

Pittsburgh Alleghenys managers
1854 births
1915 deaths
Minor league baseball managers